Ilpo Verno (born 22 December 1981) is a Finnish former professional footballer who played as a midfielder.

Personal life
In September 2005 Verno was hospitalised after losing consciousness.

References

External links
 
 

1981 births
Living people
Finnish footballers
Association football midfielders
Footballers from Helsinki
Veikkausliiga players
Ykkönen players
AC Allianssi players
FF Jaro players
FC Honka players
FC Viikingit players
FC Hämeenlinna players